Ilona Arrives with the Rain is a 1996 Colombian-Spanish-Italian drama film directed by Sergio Cabrera. It premiered at the 53rd Venice International Film Festival, in which it entered the main competition. It was later screened at the Toronto International Film Festival and at the Sundance Film Festival.

Cast  
Margarita Rosa de Francisco as Ilona Grabowska
Imanol Arias as  Abdul
Pastora Vega as  Larissa
Humberto Dorado as  Maqroll 
David Riondino as Alex

References

External links

1996 films
Colombian drama films
1996 drama films
Italian drama films
Films scored by Luis Bacalov
Films based on Colombian novels
Spanish drama films
1990s Italian films
1990s Spanish films